Julius Caesar is a 1970 film adaptation of William Shakespeare's play of the same name, directed by Stuart Burge. It stars Charlton Heston as Mark Antony, Jason Robards as Brutus, Richard Johnson as Cassius, John Gielgud as Caesar, Robert Vaughn as Casca, Richard Chamberlain as Octavius, and Diana Rigg as Portia. It was an independent production of Commonwealth United Entertainment, filmed in England and Spain. It is the first film version of the play made in colour.

Plot

Cast

Production

The film was shot primarily at MGM-British Studios and Pinewood Studios in England. The battle sequences were filmed on-location in Manzanares el Real, Spain.

Casting
Orson Welles was the first choice to portray Brutus, but was passed over for Jason Robards, who had considerable difficulties during production:  frequently missing rehearsals, refusing to appear on horseback, and holding up the proceedings due to illness.

John Gielgud and Charlton Heston had both appeared in previous film adaptations of Shakespeare's play; Gielgud played Cassius in the 1953 film directed by Joseph L. Mankiewicz, and Heston also played Mark Antony in a low-budget 1950 version. He would do so yet again, in a 1972 film version of Shakespeare's Antony and Cleopatra, which Heston also directed.

Peter Eyre is credited as playing Cinna the poet, but his role was cut from the final film. Max Adrian was cast in a featured role, but dropped out before filming.

Release
Julius Caesar had its world premiere in Tokyo on 20 February 1970 and was released in the UK on 4 June 1970. The film failed at the box office.

Reception

Critical response
The reviews for this version upon its theatrical release were mostly negative, with Robards especially being criticized for his wooden performance as Brutus.

Howard Thompson wrote in his review: 

Critic Roger Ebert gives it only one star. In his review, he wrote: 

Charlton Heston later expressed dissatisfaction with the film, which had been a passion project, claiming it had a poor director, an unsuitable cameraman, and the wrong actor as Brutus. He called Jason Robards’ performance “the worst performance by a really good actor.”

Home media
The film was released on DVD on 11 May 2004 initially and then 1 February 2005, 25 July 2006, and 19 February 2013 afterwards. Upon its 2013 Blu-ray disc release, it met with a more positive review from the website DVD Talk, although Jason Robards' performance was still soundly panned. Its previous DVD release, which was pan-and-scanned rather than letterboxed, had been harshly criticized, and several other DVD reviewers also disparaged the film.

See also
 List of historical films
 List of films set in ancient Rome
 Julius Caesar (1953 film)

References

External links
 
 
 
 

1970 films
1970 drama films
1970 war films
1970s historical films
American epic films
American war drama films
American historical films
British epic films
British war drama films
British historical films
Cultural depictions of Cicero
Cultural depictions of Marcus Junius Brutus
Depictions of Augustus on film
Cultural depictions of Julius Caesar
Cultural depictions of Mark Antony
1970s English-language films
Films based on Julius Caesar (play)
Films set in ancient Rome
Films set in the 1st century BC
Films shot at Pinewood Studios
Films shot in England
Films shot in Spain
Films directed by Stuart Burge
War epic films
Films shot at MGM-British Studios
1970s American films
1970s British films